"Ain't No Need to Worry" is a song by American recording artists the Winans featuring Anita Baker. The song was released as the lead single of the Winans' fifth album, Decisions. "Ain't No Need to Worry" is a mixture of contemporary gospel and contemporary R&B. The single peaked at number 15 on the Billboard's R&B/Hip-Hop Singles chart.

Awards
The song won a Grammy in 1988 for Best Soul Gospel Performance by a Duo or Group, Choir or Chorus

Charts

References

External links
 Anita Baker
 The Winans

1987 singles
Anita Baker songs
The Winans songs
Gospel songs
1980s ballads
Contemporary R&B ballads